The 2017 Go Bowling 400 is a Monster Energy NASCAR Cup Series race held on May 13, 2017, at Kansas Speedway in Kansas City, Kansas. Contested over 267 laps on the 1.5 mile (2.4 km) asphalt speedway, it was the 11th race of the 2017 Monster Energy NASCAR Cup Series season.

Report

Background

Kansas Speedway is a  tri-oval race track in Kansas City, Kansas. It was built in 2001 and hosts two annual NASCAR race weekends. The Verizon IndyCar Series also raced at here until 2011. The speedway is owned and operated by the International Speedway Corporation.

Entry list

Practice

First practice

Final practice

Qualifying

He said afterwards that 2017 "has been a big step up in qualifying. Your car and track changes and you have to be on top of that. Everyone has done a great job of staying on top of that. We have been really close a couple times this year but it feels good to get it done. I know it is only qualifying but it feels really cool to get this first pole. It says a lot about this entire team.”

Qualifying results

Race

First stage
Ryan Blaney led the field to the green flag at 7:53 p.m. Martin Truex Jr. shot past his outside exiting Turn 2 to take the lead on lap 11. The first caution of the race flew on lap 29 when Landon Cassill's right-front tire went flat and he slammed the wall in Turn 1.

The race restarted on lap 35. Cassill brought out the second caution on lap 50 when he slammed the wall a second time. Kevin Harvick opted not to pit and assumed the lead. During the caution period, Chase Elliott was exiting his pit box just as Michael McDowell was entering his when McDowell came across the nose of Elliott, causing damage to Elliott's car.

The race restarted on lap 55. The third caution flew on lap 58 when Ty Dillon spun out in Turn 2.

The race restarted on lap 62. Harvick spun his tires on the restart, Kyle Busch took over the race lead and drove on to win the first stage. The fourth caution flew on lap 80 for the conclusion of the stage. Truex exited pit road with the race lead. Jimmie Johnson restarted from the tail-end of the field for driving through too many pit boxes.

Second stage
The race restarted on lap 88. Erik Jones brought out the fifth caution on lap 97 when he spun out in Turn 2.

The race restarted on lap 100 and Busch took back the lead exiting Turn 2. Debris in Turn 2, from Johnson's car, brought out the sixth caution on lap 102.

The race restarted on lap 105. Brad Keselowski, who was running fifth, made an unscheduled stop for a loose wheel on lap 120. He was then hit with a pass through penalty for driving through too many pit boxes. He rejoined the race 35th two laps down. The seventh caution flew on lap 136 when Corey LaJoie suffered cuts on both right-side tires and slammed the wall in Turn 3.

The race restarted on lap 142. The eighth caution flew on lap 146 when Gray Gaulding slammed the wall in Turn 4, and his right-rear tire shredded in Turn 2.

The race restarted on lap 152. Blaney won the second stage and the ninth caution flew for the conclusion of the stage.

Final stage

The race restarted on lap 167. Truex took the lead going into Turn 3 with 87 laps to go. The 10th caution flew with 74 to go for a two-car wreck in Turn 1 involving A. J. Allmendinger and Paul Menard.

The race restarted with 69 to go. The following lap, Joey Logano went to the outside of Danica Patrick for position going into Turn 1 when he suffered a right-front brake failure, veered down and hooked Patrick, sending her head-on into the outside wall. Logano's car got loose and slid backwards into the wall not far ahead of her. Aric Almirola, who was seven car length's back of the wreck when it started, got loose in the top lane, couldn't slow it down in time, clipped the left-rear corner of Patrick's car and slammed into the drivers-side of Logano's car, lifting his car in the air for a few seconds. Logano and Patrick exited their wrecked cars under their own power, but Almirola, who put his window net down (to signal the safety crews that he was "alert"), required the safety team to extract him, and air lift to a local hospital, due to an injury that he sustained. This violent three-car wreck brought out the 11th caution with 68 to go, and cleanup necessitated a red flag for roughly 30 minutes.

Logano said after he was released from the infield care center that all three drivers involved "took a hard hit. Something broke on (my) car - I don't know what it was. I noticed it going in (to the turn) and tried to back off but you're going 215 (mph). I took a hard left. I just hope everyone is OK. I hooked Danica. I haven't seen the replay (until now). don't know what happened. The right-front popped and I took a hard left. I hope Aric is alright. That's the last thing you want to see is a big hit like that for anyone. It came out of nowhere. Everything was fine and I just took a hard one. I'm praying for Aric right now. I hate to be the part that started it but there was nothing I could have done. Something broke and we tore up a lot of cars."

The race restarted with 63 to go. The 12th caution flew with 52 to go when Jones got loose in the speedy dry in the top lane of Turns 1 and 2, laid down for the previous three-car wreck with 68 to go, and spun out in Turn 2. Dale Earnhardt Jr. opted not to pit and assumed the lead.

The race restarted with 47 to go and Blaney edged out Busch at the line to retake the lead. Truex passed him exiting Turn 2 with 24 to go to retake the lead. The 13th caution flew with 22 to go when LaJoie slammed the wall in Turn 1. Jones opted not to pit and assumed the lead.

The race restarted with 19 to go. Truex went to Blaney's outside and powered around him and teammate Jones in Turn 1 to take the lead with 18 to go. The 14th caution flew with nine to go when Jones got turned by Dillon exiting Turn 4 and spun through the infield grass.

The race restarted with five to go and Johnson and Kurt Busch made contact, sending Johnson spinning through Turn 1 and put the race under caution for the 15th time.

The race restarted with two laps to go. Truex drove on to score the victory.

Race results

Stage results

Stage 1
Laps: 80

Stage 2
Laps: 80

Final stage results

Stage 3
Laps: 107

Race statistics
 Lead changes: 9 among different drivers
 Cautions/Laps: 15 for 61
 Red flags: 1 for 27 minutes and 41 seconds
 Time of race: 3 hours, 24 minutes and 16 seconds
 Average speed:

Media

Television
Fox Sports covered their seventh race at the Kansas Speedway. Mike Joy, three-time Kansas winner Jeff Gordon and Darrell Waltrip called in the booth for the race. Jamie Little, Vince Welch and Matt Yocum handled the action on pit road for the television side.

Radio
MRN had the radio call for the race which was also simulcasted on Sirius XM NASCAR Radio. Joe Moore, Jeff Striegle and Rusty Wallace called the race in the booth when the field raced through the tri-oval. Dave Moody covered the race from the Sunoco spotters stand outside turn 2 when the field is racing through turns 1 and 2. Mike Bagley called the race from a platform outside turn 4. Alex Hayden, Winston Kelley, Kim Coon, and Steve Post worked pit road for the radio side.

Standings after the race

Drivers' Championship standings

Manufacturers' Championship standings

Note: Only the first 16 positions are included for the driver standings.
. – Driver has clinched a position in the Monster Energy NASCAR Cup Series playoffs.

References

2017 in sports in Kansas
2017 Monster Energy NASCAR Cup Series
May 2017 sports events in the United States
NASCAR races at Kansas Speedway